Phước Vĩnh is a township and capital of Phú Giáo District, Bình Dương Province.

References

Populated places in Bình Dương province
District capitals in Vietnam
Townships in Vietnam